Basketball at the 1960 Summer Olympics was the fifth appearance of the sport of basketball as an official Olympic medal event.  16 nations were admitted into the Olympic tournament, with many others being eliminated in a pre-Olympic tournament held earlier in the year from 13 to 20 August 1960 at the Land Rover Arena at Bologna. 64 games of basketball were played in the Olympic tournament that was held at the Palazzetto dello Sport and PalaLottomatica, both in Rome.

The 16 teams were split up into four groups for the preliminary round.  Each team played every other team in its group once.  The top two teams in each group advanced to the semifinals in two pools of four, while the lower two teams were sent to a consolation semifinal for 9th through 16th place.

In the semifinal, each team again played every other team in its pool, none of which it had played against previously.  The top two teams in each of the two semifinals moved on to the final, with the lower two teams in each playing in a classification for 5th through 8th place.  The consolation semifinal worked the same way, with the top two teams moving into a classification for 9th through 12th place and the lower two playing in classification for 13th through 16th places.

For the final, each of the four teams had already played against one of the other three in the semifinal.  The results of those games carried over into the final and each team played the remaining two finalists once (even though the teams may have played each other in the preliminary round, those results were not carried over).  The results of that pool determined final ranking.  Each of the classifications worked identically to the final.

Medalists

Pre-Olympic Qualifier

Five teams were given a spot in the 1960 Olympic Games via a tournament held in August:

Squads
For the team rosters see: Basketball at the 1960 Summer Olympics – Men's team rosters.

Results

Preliminary round

Group A

Group B

Group C

Group D

Classification 9–16

Pool C

Pool D

Classification 13–16
Spain's victory over Japan carried over, as did Puerto Rico's win in Bulgaria's forfeit.

Classification 9–12
France's victory over Mexico and Hungary's over the Philippines carried over.

Semifinals

Pool A

Pool B

Classification 5–8
Czechoslovakia's victory over Poland and Yugoslavia's win over Uruguay carried over to this round.

Medal round 
The United States' win over the Soviet Union and Brazil's victory over Italy carried over.

Awards

Final ranking

References

 
basketball
1960
1960 in basketball
International basketball competitions hosted by Italy